Global Express may refer to:

Bombardier Global Express, a business jet
Global Xpress, a satellite internet service by Inmarsat
Team Global Express, formerly Toll Global Express